John Chambers Hughes (1891–1971), was an American diplomat and the United States Permanent Representative to NATO from 12 June 1953 until 20 April 1955. A graduate of Princeton University, he was a close friend of CIA Director Allen Dulles.  Hughes, a Wall Street financier, was the head of the New York bureau of the Office of Strategic Services during World War II.

Notes

Permanent Representatives of the United States to NATO
1891 births
1971 deaths